Ľuboš Kupčík (born 3 March 1989) is a Slovak professional footballer who currently plays for Dukla Banská Bystrica. He returned to the team after spending five years playing for ŽP Šport Podbrezová.

References

External links
FO ŽP Šport Podbrezová profile 

Profile at futbalnet.sk 

1989 births
Living people
Slovak footballers
Association football defenders
FK Dukla Banská Bystrica players
FK Železiarne Podbrezová players
Slovak Super Liga players
2. Liga (Slovakia) players
People from Trstená
Sportspeople from the Žilina Region